The Francisca Club is a women's only private social club in San Francisco, California. It is apparently the oldest private women's club surviving in San Francisco and has been in its clubhouse since the 1920s. It had typically had a membership of around 500; however, recently this has declined to closer to 400.

Two other women's clubs in San Francisco were the Woman's Athletic Club of San Francisco, whose 640 Sutter St. building was built in 1914, and the Women's Club of San Francisco, whose Sutter Street building was built in  1927.

References

Clubs and societies in California
Women's clubs in the United States
Organizations based in San Francisco
Organizations established in the 1920s
History of women in California